The Georgetown University School of Continuing Studies (SCS) is a school at Georgetown University in Washington, D.C. SCS offers graduate programs in professional and liberal studies.

Academics

Liberal Studies 
The School of Continuing Studies offers degrees in Liberal Studies at the bachelor's, master's, and doctoral levels.

Master of Professional Studies (MPS) 
SCS offers Master of Professional Studies degrees.

Certificates, workshops, and custom education 
SCS offers noncredit professional certificate programs and workshop courses.

More than 2,000 high school students each summer to participate in summer high school programs.

SCS also administers summer sessions for current undergraduate and graduate students. Courses are formatted as small, interactive classes.

English Language Center offers a variety of programs for teachers and students of the English language.

Administration 
Kelly J. Otter, Ph.D., has served as dean of the School of Continuing Studies since 2014.

List of deans

References

Citations

Sources

External links
Georgetown University School for Continuing Studies

Educational institutions established in 1970
Continuing Studies